Gopinath Pandurang Munde (12 December 1949 – 3 June 2014) was an Indian politician from Maharashtra.  A popular Leader in Maharashtra called a Lokneta. He was a senior leader of the Bharatiya Janata Party (BJP) and Union Minister for Rural and Panchayati Raj in Narendra Modi's Cabinet. He is well known for being the mastermind behind the finish of the underworld in Mumbai, as deputy chief minister and home minister of Maharashtra in 1995-1999. He is a chief architect who introduced the Maharashtra Control of Organised Crime Act in assembly which was ratified by the supreme court of India.

Early life and education
Munde (POS) was born in Parali, Maharashtra, on 12 December 1949, to Pandurang and Limbabai Munde in a middle class Vanjari farmer's family.

His primary education was in the village that did not have a school building. The "school" was held under the shade of a tree. He was an average student; not very bright, not a dullard either.

He moved on to tehsil town Parali for the secondary education in the Zilla Parishad School. He used to go to Arya Samaj Mandir everyday to read newspapers and books and listen to discourses given by men of wisdom. After matriculation, he joined the college in Ambejogai for graduation in Commerce. He did not have political background in his family, yet he was drawn to the students' movement in the college. He became a kingmaker of sorts, ensuring victory of members of his group though he did not win an election even once during those four memorable years.

Munde attended a government primary school, in Nathra village, Beed district where classes were conducted "under a tree". He later attended the Zilla Parishad high school in Parali. He obtained a B.Com. from college in Ambejogai. Subsequently, he studied at the ILS College in Pune.

After Gopinath Munde became Minister of Rural Development in 2014, controversy erupted over his educational qualification. According to the affidavit submitted to Election Commission by Munde for the Lok Sabha elections, he graduated from New Law College, Pune in 1976 but the college was established in 1978. Later it was confirmed that the degree was issued by the Pune University and not by the college. He has done a BCom and a BGL. he did an LLB for two years from the ILS College. However, it isn't the college that issues the degree certificate, it's Pune University.

Political career 

He was a member of Maharashtra's Legislative Assembly (MLA) from Renapur (Vidhan Sabha constituency) for five terms during 1980–1985 and 1990–2009. He was also the leader of opposition in the Assembly during 1992–1995.

He had held the post of Deputy Chief Minister of Maharashtra in 1995–1999.
Munde was elected to Lok Sabha in 2009 and 2014, and served as the deputy leader of the BJP in the Lok Sabha. He was appointed in Modi's cabinet and took the oath on 26 May, but died in New Delhi a week later on 3 June 2014. As per media reports he died in a road accident. However, on 21 Jan 2019, a US hacker claimed that Mr. Munde was murdered. He is the shortest served Cabinet minister ever in Indian history.
Munde got involved in politics when he met Pramod Mahajan, a friend and colleague in the college. As a member of the Akhil Bharatiya Vidyarthi Parishad, he took part in the agitation against the state of emergency imposed by the then Prime Minister Indira Gandhi. He was incarcerated in the Nashik central jail until the Emergency was lifted.

In 1971, he associated with the campaign of the Bharatiya Jana Sangh candidate in the Lok Sabha election in the Beed constituency. He attended the Rashtriya Swayamsevak Sangh's Shiksha Varga (Training Camp) held in Pune that year. He soon became the Sambhajinagar Mandal Karyavah, looking after half a dozen shakhas of the RSS, and subsequently, the in-charge of its Pune City Students' Cell. Later, he was made a member of the executive committee of the city RSS. The Janata Party by this time had split, and the Bharatiya Janata Party, founded by the leaders the erstwhile Bharatiya Jana Sangh had come into existence. Munde was made President of the Maharashtra unit of the BJP's youth wing, the Bharatiya Janata Yuva Morcha.

Work against underworld 
When munde was deputy chief minister of Maharashtra state, he worked against gang wars and underworld Don's.
After 1993 Mumbai attacks munde took over the home ministry of Maharashtra state and started war against underworld Don's and their supporters.

Vidhan Sabha 
He contested election from Parli (Vidhan Sabha constituency) in 1978 but lost. He was first elected to Vidhan Sabha from Renapur in 1980 as BJP candidate and later represented the seat again in 1995, 1999 and 2004.
He was the Leader of Opposition in Maharashtra Vidhan Sabha from 12 December 1991 to 14 March 1995. Munde was sworn in as the Deputy Chief Minister of Maharashtra when Manohar Joshi-led government took over the reins of the state on 14 March 1995.

Lok Sabha 
Munde served as a member of the 15th Lok Sabha (2009–2014), representing the Beed constituency.
Munde defeated Rameshrao Baburao Kokate (Adaskar) an NCP Candidate. In 2014, Munde again won the Lok sabha election from Beed Constituency by margin of 140,000 votes. Subsequently, on 26 May 2014, he was appointed as Minister of Rural Development in the cabinet of Prime minister Narendra Modi. Within a few days, he was involved in a car accident and died within a few minutes of the mishap.

Personal life
Munde's father Pandurangrao and mother Limbabai struggled against heavy odds and did not spare any efforts to provide for his education. After the death of his father in 1969, his brothers took care of his education. He was the third child in the family. His wife Pradnya is a graduate and a housewife. He met her during his college days at Ambajogai. Her elder brother Pramod Mahajan was Information and Broadcasting Minister in the Atal Behari Vajpayee government.

Munde has three daughters, named Pankaja, Preetam and Yashashri. Pankaja Munde, the eldest daughter, was a minister in Maharashtra Government from 2014 to 2019. Pritam Munde, his second daughter, is a member of Lok Sabha since 2014, first elected from her father's seat which fell vacant after his sudden death. His nephew, Dhananjay Munde, is a member of Nationalist Congress Party, and a cabinet minister in Maharashtra government since 2019.

Death 

As per media reports, Munde met with a road accident in the early morning of 3 June 2014, while on his way to Delhi airport. He was going for his first official meeting after taking the post. The accident took place between Safdarjung Road and Prithviraj Road, New Delhi where his car was hit by a speeding cab. He was immediately rushed to the AIIMS hospital but later went into cardiac arrest. He was administered CPR but could not be resuscitated and was declared dead at 7:20 a.m.

Munde suffered cervical fractures due to which supply of oxygen to his brain was cut off. Further, his liver was ruptured due to impact of accident
According to the preliminary post mortem report, his liver ruptured due to the accident leading to cardiac arrest.

His funeral was held at 2pm on 4 June 2014 at his native place Parali Vaijenath near Beed. Pankaja Munde, Gopinath Munde's daughter performed the last rites to her father.

The accident as a reason behind his death was questioned and raised speculations in media when on 21 Jan 2019 a US hacker claimed that Munde was murdered. Followed after this claim a statement was issued by Union Law Minister Ravi Shankar Prasad, saying Munde's death was caused by neck injury when in the post mortem report it was mentioned that he died because of liver rupture. Amidst the speculations, Munde's nephew Dhananjay Munde also had asked for probe into his death.

References

https://www.thehindu.com/news/national/Bhujbal-Munde-pitch-for-OBC-census/article16365507.ece

External links

|-

|-

|-

|-

|-

1949 births
India MPs 2009–2014
Deputy Chief Ministers of Maharashtra
People from Beed district
Maharashtra MLAs 1990–1995
Maharashtra MLAs 1995–1999
Maharashtra MLAs 1999–2004
Maharashtra MLAs 2004–2009
Bharatiya Janata Party politicians from Maharashtra
Marathi politicians
Lok Sabha members from Maharashtra
2014 deaths
Members of the Cabinet of India
Road incident deaths in India
Leaders of the Opposition in the Maharashtra Legislative Assembly
Indians imprisoned during the Emergency (India)
People from Marathwada
India MPs 2014–2019
Narendra Modi ministry
Accidental deaths in India
Maharashtra MLAs 1980–1985